A by-election was held for the Australian House of Representatives seat of Dawson on 26 February 1966. This was triggered by the death of Country Party MP George Shaw.

The by-election was won by Labor candidate Rex Patterson.

Results

References

1966 elections in Australia
Queensland federal by-elections
1960s in Queensland
February 1966 events in Australia